Dictyosiphon is a genus of brown algae belonging to the family Chordariaceae.

The genus has almost cosmopolitan distribution.

Species:

Dictyosiphon chordaria 
Dictyosiphon ekmanii 
Dictyosiphon filiformis 
Dictyosiphon finmarkicus 
Dictyosiphon foeniculaceus 
Dictyosiphon fragilis 
Dictyosiphon macounii

References

Chordariaceae
Brown algae genera